Pchelnik is a rural locality (a village) in Bizhbulyaksky Selsoviet, Bizhbulyaksky District, Bashkortostan, Russia. The population was 56 as of 2010. There is 1 street.

Geography 
Pchelnik is located 10 km southwest of Bizhbulyak (the district's administrative centre) by road. Lassirma is the nearest rural locality.

References 

Rural localities in Bizhbulyaksky District